Slovenia participated in the Eurovision Song Contest 2017 with the song "On My Way" written and performed by Omar Naber, who had previously represented Slovenia in the Eurovision Song Contest in 2005 where he failed to qualify to the final with the song "Stop". Slovenian broadcaster Radiotelevizija Slovenija (RTV Slovenija) organised the national selection EMA 2017 in order to select the Slovenian entry for the 2017 contest in Kyiv, Ukraine. After a two-week-long competition consisting of two semi-finals, and a final, "On My Way" performed by Omar Naber emerged as the winner after achieving the highest score following the combination of votes from a regional jury vote from six regions in Slovenia and a public vote.

Slovenia was drawn to compete in the first semi-final of the Eurovision Song Contest which took place on 9 May 2017. Performing during the show in position 17, "On My Way" was not announced among the top 10 entries of the first semi-final and therefore did not qualify to compete in the final.

Background 

Slovenia's highest placing in the contest, to this point, has been seventh place, which the nation achieved on two occasions: in 1995 with the song "Prisluhni mi" performed by Darja Švajger and in 2001 with the song "Energy" performed by Nuša Derenda. The country's only other top ten result was achieved in 1997 when Tanja Ribič performing "Zbudi se" placed tenth. Since the introduction of semi-finals to the format of the contest in 2004, Slovenia had thus far only managed to qualify to the final on four occasions. In 2016, Slovenia was represented by ManuElla and the song "Blue and Red", but the country didn't qualify for the final.

The Slovenian national broadcaster, Radiotelevizija Slovenija (RTV Slovenija), broadcasts the event within Slovenia and organises the selection process for the nation's entry. The Slovenian entry for the Eurovision Song Contest has traditionally been selected through a national final entitled Evrovizijska Melodija (EMA), which has been produced with variable formats. To this point, the broadcaster has only foregone the use of this national final in 2013 when the Slovenian entry was internally selected. For 2017, the broadcaster opted to organise EMA 2017 to select the Slovenian entry.

Before Eurovision

EMA 2017 

EMA 2017 was the 21st edition of the Slovenian national final format Evrovizijska Melodija (EMA). The competition was used by RTV Slovenija to select Slovenia's entry for the Eurovision Song Contest 2017. The 2017 edition of EMA took place at the Gospodarsko razstavišče in Ljubljana and consisted of three shows: two semi-finals and a final. The competition was broadcast on TV SLO1, Radio Val 202, Radio Koper, Radio Maribor and online via the broadcaster's RTV 4D platform.

Format 
Sixteen songs competed in three televised shows consisting of two semi-finals on 17 and 18 February 2017 and a final on 24 February 2017. Eight songs competed in each semi-final with a seven-member expert jury and public televoting selecting four finalists out of the eight songs to proceed to the final. The televote selected the first two finalists and the jury selected the other two finalists. In the final, the winner was selected by the 50/50 combination of points from six regional juries and public televoting.

Competing entries
Artists and composers were able to submit their entries to the broadcaster between 20 July 2016 and 3 November 2016. 90 entries were received by the broadcaster during the submission period. An expert committee consisting of ManuElla (singer-songwriter, music producer and 2016 Slovenian Eurovision entrant), Boštjan Grabnar (musician, composer and music producer), Aleksander Radić (Head of the Slovenian delegation at the Eurovision Song Contest) and Jernej Vene (music editor for Radio Val 202) selected sixteen artists and songs for the competition from the received submissions. The competing artists were announced on 4 December 2016. Among the competing artists were former Slovenian Eurovision contestants Omar Naber who represented Slovenia in 2005 and Amaya who represented Slovenia in 2011. On 20 January 2017, Amaya announced that she would be withdrawing from the competition on the advice of her record label and was replaced with the song "Tok ti sede" performed by Clemens.

Shows

Semi-finals
The two semi-finals of EMA 2017 took place on 17 and 18 February 2017, hosted by Tina Gorenjak, Maja Martina Merljak and Tanja Kocman. The eight competing entries in each semi-final first faced a public vote where the top two proceeded. An additional two qualifiers were then selected out of the remaining six entries by a seven-member jury panel. The jury consisted of Martin Štibernik (singer, composer and music producer), Alenka Godec (singer), Rebeka Dremelj (singer, actress, model and 2008 Slovenian Eurovision entrant), Patrik Greblo (conductor and composer), Eva Boto (singer and 2012 Slovenian Eurovision entrant), Jernej Dirnbek (musician) and Anika Horvat (singer).  In addition to the performances of the competing entries, Eva Boto, ManuElla and Veseli svatje performed as guests in first semi-final, while Samuel Lucas and Alenka Godec performed as guests in the second semi-final.

Final
The final of EMA 2017 took place on 24 February 2017, hosted by Tina Gorenjak, Maja Martina Merljak, Tanja Kocman and Mario Galunič. In addition to the performances of the competing entries, 1994 Croatian Eurovision entrant Toni Cetinski and Ukrainian 2016 Eurovision winner Jamala and ManuElla performed as guests. The combination of points from six regional juries and a public vote selected "On My Way" performed by Omar Naber as the winner. Each jury group distributed their points as follows: 2, 4, 6, 8, 10 and 12 points, while the viewers distributed their points as follows: 12, 24, 36, 48, 60 and 72 points.

Promotion
Omar Naber made several appearances across Europe to specifically promote "On My Way" as the Slovenian Eurovision entry. On 2 April, Naber performed during the London Eurovision Party, which was held at the Café de Paris venue in London, United Kingdom and hosted by Nicki French and Paddy O'Connell. Between 3 and 6 April, Naber took part in promotional activities in Tel Aviv, Israel where he performed during the Israel Calling event held at the Ha'teatron venue. On 8 April, Omar Naber performed during the Eurovision in Concert event which was held at the Melkweg venue in Amsterdam, Netherlands and hosted by Cornald Maas and Selma Björnsdóttir.

At Eurovision 

According to Eurovision rules, all nations with the exceptions of the host country and the "Big Five" (France, Germany, Italy, Spain and the United Kingdom) are required to qualify from one of two semi-finals in order to compete for the final; the top ten countries from each semi-final progress to the final. The European Broadcasting Union (EBU) split up the competing countries into six different pots based on voting patterns from previous contests, with countries with favourable voting histories put into the same pot. On 31 January 2017, a special allocation draw was held which placed each country into one of the two semi-finals, as well as which half of the show they would perform in. Slovenia was placed into the first semi-final, to be held on 9 May 2017, and was scheduled to perform in the second half of the show.

Once all the competing songs for the 2017 contest had been released, the running order for the semi-finals was decided by the shows' producers rather than through another draw, so that similar songs were not placed next to each other. Slovenia was set to perform in position 17, following the entry from Armenia and before the entry from Latvia.

In Slovenia, the semi-finals were televised on RTV SLO2 and the final was televised on RTV SLO1 with commentary by Andrej Hofer. The contest was also broadcast via radio with the second semi-final and final airing on Radio Val 202 and all three shows airing on Radio Maribor. The Slovenian spokesperson, who announced the top 12-point score awarded by the Slovenian jury during the final, was Katarina Čas.

Semi-final

Omar Naber took part in technical rehearsals on 1 and 5 May, followed by dress rehearsals on 8 and 9 May. This included the jury show on 8 May where the professional juries of each country watched and voted on the competing entries.

The Slovenian performance featured Omar Naber performing alone in a black leather suit. The stage colours were black, blue and white and the performance also featured the use of the chandelier on stage and mini screens belonging to the chandelier that were lowered for the first half of the song, with Naber in the centre of them, and raised up later on during the performance.

At the end of the show, Slovenia was not announced among the top 10 entries in the first semi-final and therefore failed to qualify to compete in the final. It was later revealed that Slovenia placed seventeenth in the semi-final, receiving a total of 36 points: 20 points from the televoting and 16 points from the juries.

Voting 
Voting during the three shows involved each country awarding two sets of points from 1–8, 10 and 12: one from their professional jury and the other from televoting. Each nation's jury consisted of five music industry professionals who are citizens of the country they represent, with their names published before the contest to ensure transparency. This jury judged each entry based on: vocal capacity; the stage performance; the song's composition and originality; and the overall impression by the act. In addition, no member of a national jury was permitted to be related in any way to any of the competing acts in such a way that they cannot vote impartially and independently. The individual rankings of each jury member as well as the nation's televoting results were released shortly after the grand final.

Below is a breakdown of points awarded to Slovenia and awarded by Slovenia in the first semi-final and grand final of the contest, and the breakdown of the jury voting and televoting conducted during the two shows:

Points awarded to Slovenia

Points awarded by Slovenia

Detailed voting results
The following members comprised the Slovene jury:
 Darja Švajger (jury chairperson)singer, vocal coach, represented Slovenia in the 1995 and 1999 contests
 Nika Zorjansinger
 Gaber Radojevičmusic producer, composer, audio engineer
 musician, lyricist
 Aleksander Lavrinimusic editor, sound editor

On 9 May 2017, it was confirmed that Aleksander Lavrini had replaced Mistermash as a member of the Slovene jury.

References

External links

  

2017
Countries in the Eurovision Song Contest 2017
Eurovision